Satya (Sanskrit: सत्य; IAST: Satya) is a Sanskrit word loosely translated as truth, essence. It also refers to a virtue in Indian religions, referring to being truthful in one's thoughts, speech and action. In Yoga, satya is one of five yamas, the virtuous restraint from falsehood and distortion of reality in one's expressions and actions.

Etymology and meaning

In the Vedas and later sutras, the meaning of the word satya evolves into an ethical concept about truthfulness and is considered an important virtue. It means being true and consistent with reality in one's thought, speech, and action.

Satya is said to have cognates in a number of diverse Indo-European languages, including the word "sooth" and "sin" in English, "istina" ("истина") in Russian, "sand" - truthful in Danish/"sann" in Swedish, and "haithya" in Avestan, the liturgical language of Zoroastrianism.

Sat
Sat  is the root of many Sanskrit words and concepts such as sattva, "pure, truthful", and satya, "truth". The Sanskrit root sat has several meanings or translations:. 
 "Absolute truth"
 "Reality
 "Brahman" (not to be confused with Brahmin)
 "unchangeable"
 "that which has no distortion"
 "that which is beyond distinctions of time, space, and person"
 "that which pervades the universe in all its constancy"

Sat is a common prefix in ancient Indian literature and variously implies that which is good, true, genuine, virtuous, being, happening, real, existing, enduring, lasting, or essential; for example, sat-sastra means true doctrine, sat-van means one devoted to the truth. In ancient texts, fusion words based on Sat, refer to "Universal Spirit, Universal Principle, Being, Soul of the World, Brahman".

The negation of sat is asat, a combination word of a and sat. Asat refers to the opposite of sat, that is delusion, distorted, untrue, the fleeting impression that is incorrect, invalid, and false.
The concepts of sat and asat are famously expressed in the Pavamana Mantra found in the  (1.3.28),

"lead me from delusion to truth; from darkness to light; from mortality to immortality"
Sat is one of the three characteristics of Brahman as described in sat-chit-ananda. This association between sat, 'truth', and Brahman, ultimate reality, is also expressed in Hindu cosmology, wherein Satyaloka, the highest heaven of Hindu cosmology, is the abode of Brahman.

Hinduism

Vedic literature

Satya is a central theme in the Vedas. It is equated with and considered necessary to the concept Ṛta (Sanskrit ऋतं ṛtaṃ) – that which is properly joined, order, rule, nature, balance, harmony. Ṛta results from Satya in the Vedas, states Holdrege, as it regulates and enables the operation of the universe and everything within it. Satya (truth) is considered essential, and without it, the universe and reality falls apart, cannot function.

In Rigveda, opposed to rita and satya are anrita and asatya (falsehood). Truth and truthfulness is considered as a form of reverence for the divine, while falsehood a form of sin. Satya includes action and speech that is factual, real, true and reverent to Ṛta in Book 1, 4, 6, 7, 9 and 10 of Rigveda. However, Satya isn't merely about one's past that is in context in the Vedas, it has one's current and one's future contexts as well. De Nicolás states, that in Rigveda, "Satya is the modality of acting in the world of Sat, as the truth to be built, formed or established".

Upanishads
Satya is a widely discussed concept in various Upanishads, including the Brihadaranyaka Upanishad where satya is called the means to Brahman, as well as Brahman (Being, true self). In hymn 1.4.14 of Brihadaranyaka Upanishad, Satya (truth) is equated to Dharma (morality, ethics, law of righteousness), as

Taittiriya Upanishad's hymn 11.11 states, "Speak the Satya (truth), conduct yourself according to the Dharma (morality, ethics, law)".

Truth is sought, praised in the hymns of Upanishads, held as one that ultimately, always prevails. The Mundaka Upanishad, for example, states in Book 3, Chapter 1,

Sandilya Upanishad of Atharvanaveda, in Chapter 1, includes ten  forbearances as virtues, in its exposition of Yoga. It defines Satya as "the speaking of the truth that conduces to the well being of creatures, through the actions of one's mind, speech or body."

Deussen states that Satya is described in the major Upanishads with two layers of meanings - one as empirical truth about reality, another as abstract truth about universal principle, being and the unchanging. Both these ideas are explained in early Upanishads, composed before 500 BC, by variously breaking the word satya or satyam into two or three syllables. In later Upanishads, the ideas evolve and transcend into satya as truth (or truthfulness), and Brahman as the Being, Be-ness, real Self, the eternal.

Epics
The Shanti Parva of the Mahabharata states, "The righteous hold that forgiveness, truth, sincerity and compassion are the foremost (of all virtues). Truth is the essence of the Vedas."

The Epic repeatedly emphasizes that Satya is a basic virtue, because everything and everyone depends on and relies on Satya.

Yoga Sutras
In the Yoga Sutras of Patanjali, it is written, “When one is firmly established in speaking truth, the fruits of action become subservient to him." In Yoga sutra, Satya is one of the five yamas, or
virtuous restraints, along with ahimsa (restraint from violence or injury to any living being); asteya (restraint from stealing); brahmacharya (celibacy or restraint from sexually cheating on one's partner); and aparigraha (restraint from covetousness and craving). Patanjali considers satya as a restraint from falsehood in one's action (body), words (speech, writing), or feelings / thoughts (mind). In Patanjali's teachings, one may not always know the truth or the whole truth, but one knows if one is creating, sustaining or expressing falsehood, exaggeration, distortion, fabrication or deception. Satya is, in Patanjali's Yoga, the virtue of restraint from such falsehood, either through silence or through stating the truth without any form of distortion.

Jainism

Satya is one of the five vows prescribed in Jain Agamas. Satya was also preached by Mahavira. According to Jainism, not to lie or speak what is not commendable. The underlying cause of falsehood is passion and therefore, it is said to cause hiṃsā (injury).

According to the Jain text Sarvārthasiddhi: "that which causes pain and suffering to the living is not commendable, whether it refers to actual facts or not".

According to Jain text, Puruşārthasiddhyupāya:

Buddhism

The term satya (Sanskrit; in Pali: sacca) is translated in English as "reality" or "truth." In terms of the Four Noble Truths (ariyasacca), the Pali can be written as sacca, tatha, anannatatha and dhamma.

'The Four Noble Truths' (ariya-sacca) are the briefest synthesis of the entire teaching of Buddhism, since all those manifold doctrines of the threefold Pali canon are, without any exception, included therein. They are the truth of suffering (mundane mental and physical phenomenon), of the origin of suffering (tanha 'pali' the craving), of the extinction of suffering (Nibbana or nirvana), and of the Noble Eightfold Path leading to the extinction of suffering (the eight supra-mundane mind factors ).

Sikhism

Indian emblem motto

The motto of the republic of India's emblem is Satyameva Jayate which is literally translated as 'Truth alone triumphs'.

See also

Notes

References

External links
http://www.sacred-texts.com/hin/yogasutr.htm

Sanskrit words and phrases
Jain philosophical concepts
Buddhist philosophical concepts
Hindu philosophical concepts
Sikh philosophical concepts
Buddhist ethics
Jain ethics
Hindu ethics
Theories of truth
Sikh terminology